Fedchenko, sometimes transliterated Fedtschenko, is a Ukrainian surname. Notable people with the surname include:

 Alexei Fedchenko (1844–1873), Russian explorer and naturalist
 Boris Fedtschenko (1872–1947), Russian phytopathologist, son of Alexei
 Olga Fedchenko (1845–1921), Russian botanist, wife of Alexei

See also
 

Ukrainian-language surnames